Edward Abbott  (died 11 August 1746) was a priest of the Church of England and academic.

Abbott was born in Middlesex and educated at  Eton College and Magdalene College, Cambridge. He was ordained in 1724 by the bishop of London and held livings at Radwinter and Faulkbourne in Essex. He was Master of Magdalene from 1740 until his death in 1746.

References 

 

18th-century English Anglican priests
People educated at Eton College
Masters of Magdalene College, Cambridge
1746 deaths